Forest City is an unincorporated community in Keener Township, Jasper County, Indiana. It was named for the native forest at the town site.

Geography

References

Unincorporated communities in Jasper County, Indiana
Unincorporated communities in Indiana